Paolo Baldieri (born 2 February 1965 in Rome) is a retired Italian football player.

He was considered one of the most promising young Italian forwards of the early 1980s and collected 14 caps and 9 goals for the Italy national under-21 football team.

He played in the Serie A for 6 seasons (112 games, 18 goals) for A.S. Roma, Pisa Calcio, Empoli F.C. and U.S. Lecce.

External links

1965 births
Living people
Italian footballers
Italy under-21 international footballers
Serie A players
Serie B players
A.S. Roma players
Pisa S.C. players
Empoli F.C. players
U.S. Avellino 1912 players
Delfino Pescara 1936 players
U.S. Lecce players
A.C. Perugia Calcio players
Association football forwards
A.S.D. Civitavecchia 1920 players